The Aces High Cuby is a family of Canadian single engine, high wing, strut-braced, light sports planes with conventional landing gear that was marketed for homebuilding by Aces High Light Aircraft of London, Ontario.

The aircraft design was available in two versions, the single-seat Cuby I and side-by-side two-seat Cuby II. Aces High went out of business in the 1990s and the kits are no longer available.

Development
The Cuby fuselage is constructed from welded 4130 steel tubing, covered with aircraft fabric. The wings are built around an aluminum spar and D-cell and also fabric-covered. The conventional landing gear includes bungee-suspended main wheels and a steerable tail wheel.

The controls are conventional three-axis, with no flaps fitted to the wing. The aircraft were available as kits or as completed aircraft and were designed to look and fly similarly to a Piper J-3 Cub. The kit price for the Cuby I was US$11,350, including the propeller and  Rotax 277 engine.

The aircraft was certified and put into production in Hungary for sale in Europe. In North America  the Cuby II was sold for US$15,662.76, complete with propeller,  Rotax 503 powerplant, paint and fabric in 1988. Available options included folding wings, floats and an agricultural spray kit.

Reviewer Ken Armstrong, flying the Cuby II prototype with the  single carburetor version of the Rotax 503 said:

Variants
Cuby I
Cuby II
Two seat, standard engine  Rotax 503, qualified as a US amateur-built and Canadian basic ultra-light, advanced ultra-light or amateur-built aircraft. More than 200 completed and flying.

Specifications (Cuby II)

See also

References

External links
Photo of Cuby II

1980s Canadian sport aircraft
Homebuilt aircraft
Single-engined tractor aircraft
Aces High Light Aircraft aircraft
High-wing aircraft